Collonista amakusaensis is a species of sea snail, a marine gastropod mollusk in the family Colloniidae.

Description
The shell reaches a height of 3 mm.

Distribution
This marine species occurs off Japan.

References

External links
 

amakusaensis
Gastropods described in 1960